Cargo Airways International was a cargo airline based in Douala, Cameroon. Its main base is Douala International Airport.

Fleet
, the Cargo Airways International fleet includes the following aircraft:

References

External links

Defunct airlines of Cameroon
Defunct cargo airlines
Companies based in Douala